Central Institute of Plastic Engineering and Technology, Murthal, formerly Central Institute of Plastics Engineering & Technology, is a public engineering institution located in Murthal in Sonipat district of Haryana in India. Established in 2017, inaugurated by CM Manohar Lal Khattar It spread over 10 acre land in the campus of Deenbandhu Chhotu Ram University of Science and Technology Murthal.

References 

2006 establishments in Haryana
Educational institutions established in 2006
Engineering colleges in Haryana
Sonipat district